Crookes Valley Park is an area of public parkland in the Crookesmoor area of the City of Sheffield in South Yorkshire, England. It is one of the three “Crookesmoor Parks” the other two being Weston Park and The Ponderosa.

History
Crookes Valley Park covers an area of approximately 4.8 hectares (11.9 acres), and the majority of the park is taken up by the lake, which was originally a water supply reservoir called the Old Great Dam. It was one of ten reservoirs built in open countryside in the valley between Crookes and Upperthorpe to supply water to the growing City of Sheffield in the 18th century.

The Old Great Dam was integrated into Crookes Valley Park when it was set out by Sheffield Corporation in the early years of the 20th century. For many years it was used as a boating lake and has been used for fishing. it is fed by a small stream which flows through a culvert into the western corner. On the south western fringe of the park is the Dam House bar and restaurant, a building of some antiquity. It was built in the 1780s when the Dam was being constructed and originally served as the house of the Water Board's solicitor.

Two Bowling greens were constructed in the park shortly after it was opened, and a children's playground was built in the 1970s. Both were constructed in a part of the park which was known as the recreation ground, and thus marked on old Ordnance Survey maps, it was an area of quite steep banking built as a dam wall for the reservoir.

Swimming 

Since the summer of 2016 the Old Great Dam lake has grown rapidly in popularity as an informal swimming spot. Swimming takes place at the lake almost every day of the year, despite signage at the site stating "No Swimming". Swimmers have been known to break ice in the middle of winter to swim, and in summer the area can become very busy with students and locals enjoying the water. Members of the Sheffield informal swimming Facebook group "SOUP - Sheffield Outdoor Plungers" have approached the council various times in attempt to replace the "No Swimming" signs with useful and accurate water safety signage, with help and advice from the Outdoor Swimming Society Inland Access Group.

On 18 July 2021, a man drowned while swimming in the lake. Emergency services arrived on scene but were unable to retrieve him in time. The park was then evacuated to make way for a more thorough search. The number of people swimming has since reduced significantly, but it is still a fairly frequent occurrence.

Artistic depictions 
The Dam House and Old Great Dam was painted by the artist William Ibbittt and is featured in a photograph from the 1950s in the Frith Collection.

References

Parks in Sheffield